How I'm Livin' is a reality television show on BET. Each week, the show profiled a couple of big names in the entertainment industry and followed them on their activities for a day. They have included those on Steve Harvey, LisaRaye, Khia, Tweet, Rickey Smiley, A.J. and Free from 106 & Park, and Guy Torry to name a few.

The show was supposed to be a competitor to MTV's highly rated Cribs.

American reality television series
BET original programming
African-American reality television series
Year of television series debut missing
Year of television series ending missing